Kottayam Institute of Technology & Science, mainly known as KiTS is located at Chengalam, India. The entire campus is situated in a plot of 16 acres (6 ha). The Chairman of the college is Dr. P. Suyambu and the Director of the college is Mr. SANIL C K.

References 

Universities and colleges in Kottayam